Karthaus Township is a township in Clearfield County, Pennsylvania, United States. The population was 819 at the 2020 census.

The township was named after Peter A. Karthaus, the proprietor of a local blast furnace.

Geography
The township is situated in eastern Clearfield County and is bordered by Centre County to the east.

Communities
Belford
Cataract
Karthaus
Oak Hill
Piper
Pottersdale

Demographics

At the 2000 census there were 811 people, 239 households, and 157 families in the township.  The population density was 22.8 people per square mile (8.8/km).  There were 359 housing units at an average density of 10.1/sq mi (3.9/km).  The racial makeup of the township was 80.27% White, 15.41% African American, 0.12% Native American, 0.25% Asian, 0.37% from other races, and 3.58% from two or more races. Hispanic or Latino of any race were 3.70%.

There were 239 households, 25.5% had children under the age of 18 living with them, 51.5% were married couples living together, 8.4% had a female householder with no husband present, and 34.3% were non-families. 31.0% of households were made up of individuals, and 15.9% were one person aged 65 or older.  The average household size was 2.38 and the average family size was 2.95.

The age distribution was 15.8% under the age of 18, 16.8% from 18 to 24, 35.5% from 25 to 44, 16.8% from 45 to 64, and 15.2% 65 or older.  The median age was 31 years. For every 100 females, there were 174.9 males.  For every 100 females age 18 and over, there were 190.6 males.

The median household income was $26,552 and the median family income  was $31,833. Males had a median income of $24,038 versus $16,250 for females. The per capita income for the township was $13,723.  About 2.7% of families and 6.7% of the population were below the poverty line, including 4.4% of those under age 18 and 11.3% of those age 65 or over.

School districts
 West Branch Area School District

Notable person

United Auto Workers organizer Wyndham Mortimer (1884-1966), First vice president of that union, from 1936 to 1939, and a key leader of the 1937 Flint Sit-Down Strike, was born in Karthaus.

References

External links

 History of Karthaus, PA

Populated places established in 1814
Townships in Clearfield County, Pennsylvania
Townships in Pennsylvania